Patrick W. Emerling (born September 19, 1992) is an American professional stock car racing driver and team owner. He competes part-time in the NASCAR Whelen Modified Tour, driving the No. 07 Chevrolet for his own team, Emerling Motorsports, as well as part-time in the NASCAR Xfinity Series, driving the No. 35/53 Chevrolet Camaro/Toyota Supra for Emerling-Gase Motorsports, a team that he co-owns with fellow driver Joey Gase.

Racing career
Emerling began racing in the NASCAR Whelen Modified Tour in 2011. He drove the No. 07 Chevrolet/Ford for his team. He ultimately finished 13th in the points standings.

Emerling kept running the full schedule in the series up to 2015, where he finished 5th in the overall standings. He only began running a few races in the succeeding years.

In 2017, Emerling got his first win in the series at Bristol, where he also began on the pole. He had two top 5 finishes and three top 10 finishes in the season.

In 2017, Emerling made his Truck Series debut, driving the No. 83 Chevrolet Silverado for Copp Motorsports at Loudon. He started 20th and finished 23rd due to engine problems. He returned to the truck at Texas, where he started 23rd and finished 26th due to a crash.

In 2018, Emerling was barely beaten by Chase Dowling at Loudon and finished second in the race. He had a total of three top fives and five top tens.

Emerling continued running some Modified races in the 2019 season.

On May 20, 2020, it was announced that Emerling would make his debut in the Xfinity Series, driving the No. 02 for Our Motorsports at the Spring Bristol race.

On December 14, 2020, it was announced that Emerling would return to Our to run another part-time schedule with the team in 2021, although now in their new second car, the No. 03, as Brett Moffitt became the full-time driver of the No. 02 that Emerling drove in his one start in 2020. After the No. 03 failed to qualify for the first few races of the season due to it not having enough owner points with entry lists of over 40 cars, Our Motorsports acquired the No. 23 car jointly fielded by RSS Racing and Reaume Brothers Racing before the race at Las Vegas in March, and Emerling ran his races in that car. He also finished second in the Modified Tour championship with three wins.

Emerling teamed up with Joey Gase in 2022 to form Emerling-Gase Motorsports. The team would field the No. 35 car, which both him and Gase as well as other drivers drove part-time. At Daytona in August, Emerling would drive the No. 5 car for B. J. McLeod Motorsports after Natalie Decker, who was scheduled to drive the car in that race, pulled out after her sponsor (a hemp/CBD product which NASCAR has to examine in order to be approved as a sponsor) had not yet gotten approval by NASCAR in time for the race. Although BJMM typically fields Chevy's, Emerling's car was a Ford fielded in a collaboration with EGM, similar to how Ryan Preece drove for the team earlier in the season in Fords fielded in a collaboration with Stewart-Haas Racing.

Motorsports career results

NASCAR
(key) (Bold – Pole position awarded by qualifying time. Italics – Pole position earned by points standings or practice time. * – Most laps led.)

Xfinity Series

Camping World Truck Series

Whelen Modified Tour

Whelen Southern Modified Tour

 Season still in progress 
 Ineligible for series points

References

External links
 

Living people
1992 births
NASCAR drivers
Racing drivers from New York (state)
NASCAR team owners